The Bengangai Game Reserve is found in South Sudan, on the border with the Democratic Republic of Congo, west of the town of Yambio. Established in 1939, it is both a game reserve and an Important Bird Area. Chimpanzees are thought to habitate the game reserve; however, there is no recent information on their population.

The vegetation of the area consists mainly of Guinea-Congolian forest.

References

Game reserves of South Sudan
Important Bird Areas of South Sudan
Protected areas established in 1939
1939 establishments in Sudan